WRSC may refer to:

 WRSC (AM), a radio station (1390 AM) licensed to serve State College, Pennsylvania, United States
 WRSC-FM, a radio station (95.3 FM) licensed to serve Bellefonte, Pennsylvania, United States
 WOWY (FM), a radio station (103.1 FM) licensed to serve State College, which held the call sign WRSC-FM from 2009 to 2016
 WRSC, for World Robotic Sailing Championship is a competition open to fully autonomous and unmanned sailing boats
 Ngloram Airport (ICAO code WRSC)
 War Resisters Support Campaign, a Canadian non-profit community organization